Beyond Appearances is the fourteenth studio album by Santana, released in 1985 (see 1985 in music).

The album took seven months to make, and involved a mostly different line-up than the previous one, Shangó (released in 1982): apart from Carlos Santana, singer Alex Ligertwood and percussionists Armando Peraza, Raul Rekow and Orestes Vilató were still with the band. This was singer Greg Walker's first album with Santana since Inner Secrets - he had left in 1979, and returned in 1983. As a result, the band had two vocalists at the time. It also was bassist Alphonso Johnson's first of two albums with the group, having joined in 1984; and the only to feature Chester C. Thompson on drums and David Sancious on keyboards. It also was the first with Chester D. Thompson on keyboards; he would remain with the band until the 2000s. The album is notable for the presence of two Chester Thompsons on the same record with the same band.

Musically, it was firmly in the style of the 1980s, making much use of synthesizers and drum machines.

Beyond Appearances performed relatively poorly, reaching only fifty on the Billboard album chart; one of its tracks, "Say It Again", reached number 46 on the Billboard Hot 100 singles chart (though it performed better on Billboard's Mainstream Rock Tracks chart, reaching number fifteen).

Track listing

Original vinyl release side one 
"Breaking Out" (Alphonso Johnson, Alex Ligertwood) – 4:30
"Written in Sand" (Mitchell Froom, Jerry Stahl) – 3:49
"How Long" (Robbie Patton) – 4:00
"Brotherhood" (David Sancious, Carlos Santana, Chester D. Thompson) – 2:26
"Spirit" (Johnson, Ligertwood, Raul Rekow) – 5:04

Original vinyl release side two 
"Say It Again" (Val Garay, Steve Goldstein, Anthony La Peau) – 3:27
"Who Loves You" (Santana, Thompson, Orestes Vilato) – 4:06
"I'm the One Who Loves You" (Curtis Mayfield) – 3:17
"Touchdown Raiders" (Santana) – 3:08
"Right Now" (Ligertwood, Santana) – 5:58

CD release 
"Breaking Out" (Johnson, Ligertwood) – 4:30
"Written in Sand" (Mitchell Froom, Jerry Stahl) – 3:49
"Brotherhood" (Sancious, Santana, Thompson) – 2:26
"Spirit" (Johnson, Ligertwood, Rekow) – 5:04
"Right Now" (Ligertwood, Santana) – 5:58
"Who Loves You" (Santana, Thompson, Vilato) – 4:06
"I'm the One Who Loves You" (Mayfield) – 3:17
"Say It Again" (Garay, Goldstein, La Peau) – 3:27
"Two Points of View" (Ligertwood, Santana) – 4:54
"How Long" (Patton) – 4:00
"Touchdown Raiders" (Santana) – 3:08

Personnel 
Carlos Santana – guitar, acoustic 12-string guitar, vocals
Alphonso Johnson – bass
Chester D. Thompson – synthesizer, bass, keyboards, organ
David Sancious – rhythm guitar, keyboards, synthesizer, guitar
Chester Cortez Thompson – drums, bass pedals
 Greg Walker – lead and background vocals
Alex Ligertwood - rhythm guitar, lead and background vocals, harmony
 Bryan Garofalo - bass
Steve Goldstein - synthesizer, keyboards
Craig Krampf - drums, DMX drum machine
Armando Peraza - bongos, percussion, shakers, congas
Orestes Vilato - bells, timbales, percussion, cymbals, woodblocks, vocals
Mitchell Froom - string synthesizer
 Raul Rekow - chekere, congas, shakers, vocals
 David Adelstein - synthesizer, DMX drum machine, synthesizer bass
 John Woodhead - guitar
 Anthony LaPeau - background vocals
 Craig Hull - guitar
 F. Bob Getter - string bass

Credits 
"How Long" arrangement: Robbie Patton, David Adelstein
"Say It Again" associate producer: Steve Goldstein
Mitchell Froom appears courtesy of Slash Records
Recorded by Val Garay & Richard Bosworth at Record One, Los Angeles
Assisted by Duane Seykora
Mixed by Val Garay at Record One
Additional recording: Plant Studios, Sausalito
Assistant engineer: Wayne Lewis, Glen Holguin
"Right Now" mixed by Jim Gaines
All information gathered from back cover of vinyl release.

Charts

Weekly charts

Year-end charts

References 

Santana (band) albums
1985 albums
Columbia Records albums
Albums produced by Val Garay